Claus Nielsen Schall  (28 April 1757 – 10 August 1835) was a Danish violinist and composer.

Notable works
Bønderne og herrerne på lystgården (ballet 1778)
Kjærlighedens og Mistankens Magt (ballet 1780)
Savoyardinderne (ballet 1781)
Andante Con Variattioni pour le Violin (1786)
Claudina af Villa bella (syngespil 1787)
Vaskepigerne og Kjedelflikkeren (ballet 1788)
Afguden paa Ceylon (ballet 1788)
Hververen (ballet 1788)
Arier, Viser, Sange og andre smaa Haandstykker. 2. samling (1788)
I Anledning af Indtoget (kantate 1790)
Fredens og Bellonæ Trætte (kantate 1790)
Fagotkoncert (1790)
Kinafarerne (syngespil 1792)
Aftenen (syngespil 1795)
Annette og Lubin (ballet 1797)
P.F. Suhms Minde (kantate 1798)
Lagertha (ballet 1801)
Domherren i Milano (syngespil 1802)
Ines de Castro (ballet 1804)
Niels Lembak (syngespil 1804)
Rolf Blaaskjæg (ballet 1808)
Romeo og Julie (ballet 1811)
Alma og Elfride (syngespil 1813)
Macbeth (ballet 1816)
Armida (ballet 1821)
Aaret (kantate 1825)

See also
List of Danish composers

References
This article was initially translated from the Danish Wikipedia.

Danish classical violinists
Male classical violinists
Danish composers
Male composers
1757 births
1835 deaths